USS Shenandoah (AD-44) was the fourth and final ship of the Yellowstone-class of destroyer tenders.  AD-44 was the fifth ship to bear the name, USS Shenandoah as named for the Shenandoah Valley.  She was commissioned in 1983, only three years after the decommissioning of the previous USS Shenandoah (AD-26), also a destroyer tender.

In 1991, USS Shenandoah was diverted to the Red Sea to tend ships of the U.S. Seventh Fleet's  Battle Group.  The Shenandoah and her crew members were awarded the Southwest Asia Service Medal with one campaign star and the Kuwait Liberation Medal (Kuwait).

Following her decommissioning in 1996, at only 13 years old, the USS Shenandoah was re-located at the James River Reserve Fleet in Fort Eustis, Va., awaiting final disposal.  In FY15, the ex-Shenandoah was sold for dismantlement, departed the JRRF and was withdrawn from MARAD inventory.

Awards and decorations 
The USS Shenandoah received the following unit awards in its history:

 Navy Meritorious Unit Commendation 
 1 May 1987 to 1 September 1988
 12 June 1989 to 31 October 1989
 1 June 1991 to 12 December 1991
 15 April 1993 to 4 October 1993 
 21 November 1994 to 13 September 1996
 Navy Battle "E" Award
 1 April 1985 to 30 September 1986
 1 October 1986 to 31 March 1988
 1 January 1995 to 31 December 1995
 National Defense Service Medal
 2 August 1990 to 30 November 1995; for service during the Gulf War 
 Southwest Asia Service Medal
 10 July 1991 to 10 August 1991;  campaign star: (Cease-Fire Campaign)
Sea Service Deployment Ribbon 
 Multiple deployments
 Kuwait Liberation Medal (Kuwait)
 10 July 1991 to 10 August 1991

References

External links 
 USS Shenandoah (AD-44) Official Crew Website
 Unofficial Navy site
 US Navy Press Release: USS Shenandoah Changes Course, Steams to Persian Gulf

 

Cold War auxiliary ships of the United States
Yellowstone-class destroyer tenders
1982 ships
Tenders of the United States Navy
Destroyer tenders of the United States